This is a list of tallest Orthodox church buildings in the world, all those higher than 70 metres.

Traditionally, an Orthodox church building is crowned by one or several domes with Orthodox crosses on the top of each. The overall height of the temple is measured by the highest point of the cross above the main temple.

The number of domes is symbolical. One dome is a symbol of Christ or God, three domes are symbolic of Trinity, five domes symbolize Christ and Four Evangelists, seven domes are often used because seven is a holy number, and thirteen domes correspond to Christ and his twelve Apostles. Other numbers are also encountered.

An Orthodox church building may also have a bell tower or zvonnitsa, either a part of the main church building, or standalone structure. Typically, bell tower is higher than the main temple.

This list is divided into two sections, one listing the highest temples and the other listing the highest bell towers or zvonnitsas.

Churches and Cathedrals

Bell towers

See also 
 List of tallest churches
 List of tallest domes
 List of tallest buildings in Russia
 List of Russian church types
 List of large Orthodox cathedrals

References 

Eastern Orthodox, tallest
Eastern Orthodox
Churches, tallest
Eastern Orthodox churches, tallest